Silver nitrite is an inorganic compound with the formula AgNO2.

Applications
Silver nitrite has many applications. Notable examples include:
 The production of aniline compounds.
 General oxidizing agent.
 Victor Meyer type nucleophilic substitution reactions with organobromides or organoiodides forming nitro compounds.
 Nitroalkene synthesis with nitryl iodide generated in-situ from silver nitrite and elemental iodine.

Production
Silver nitrite is produced from the reaction between silver nitrate and an alkali nitrite, such as sodium nitrite. Silver nitrite is much less soluble in water than silver nitrate, and a solution of silver nitrate will readily precipitate silver nitrite upon addition of sodium nitrite:

AgNO3 (aq) + NaNO2 (s) → NaNO3 (aq) + AgNO2 (precipitate)

Alternatively, it can be produced by the reaction between silver sulfate and barium nitrite.

References

Silver compounds
Nitrites